Aristida is a very nearly cosmopolitan genus of plants in the grass family. Aristida is distinguished by having three awns (bristles) on each lemma of each floret. The genus includes about 300 species found worldwide, often in arid warm regions. This genus is among those colloquially called three-awns wiregrasses, speargrasses and needlegrasses. The name Aristida is derived from the Latin "arista", meaning "awn".

They are characteristic of semiarid grassland. The Wiregrass Region of North America is named for A. stricta. Other locales where this genus is an important component of the ecosystem include the Carolina Bays, the sandhills of the Carolinas, and elsewhere, Mulga scrub in Australia, and the xeric grasslands around Lake Turkana in Africa. Local increases in the abundance of wiregrasses is a good indicator of overgrazing, as livestock avoid them.

Description
Aristida stems are ascending to erect, with both basal and cauline leaves.  The leaves may be flat or inrolled, and the basal leaves may be tufted. The inflorescences may be either panicle-like or raceme-like, with spiky branches.  The glumes of a spikelet are narrow lanceolate, usually without any awns, while the lemmas are hard, three-veined, and have the three awns near the tip. The awns may be quite long; in A. purpurea  var. longiseta they may be up to 10 cm.

Species 

Selected species include:
{{columns-list|colwidth=30em|
 Aristida adscensionis L.
 Aristida anaclasta
 Aristida basiramea – fork-tipped three-awn, forked three-awn
 Aristida behriana F.Muell.
 Aristida beyrichiana - southern wiregrass for which The Wiregrass Area, located in southeast Alabama, North Florida, and southwest Georgia is named.
 Aristida burkei – bohlanya-ba-pere (Sesotho: "horse-madness grass")
 Aristida californica
 Aristida calycina R.Br.
 Aristida capillacea Lam.
 Aristida chaseae
 Aristida congesta
 Aristida contorta F.Muell.
 Aristida dichotoma Michx. – churchmouse threeawn, poverty grass
 Aristida divaricata
 Aristida granitica
 Aristida guayllabambensis
 Aristida junciformis
 Aristida longespica – slim-spiked three-awn
 Aristida oligantha Michx. – prairie three-awn
 Aristida portoricensis – pelos del diablo
 Aristida pungens – drinn
 Aristida purpurascens Poiret – arrowfeather three-awn
 Aristida purpurea – purple three-awn
 Aristida ramosa R.Br.
 Aristida refracta Aristida rhizomophora Aristida rufescens Aristida stricta – pineland three-awn, wiregrass
 Aristida tuberculosa Aristida vagans Aristida vaginata}}

 See also 
 Puccinia aristidae'', a plant pathogenic urediniomycete fungus first described from three-awn grass
 List of Poaceae genera

References

 
Poaceae genera
Taxa named by Carl Linnaeus